John Joseph Smith (1858 – January 6, 1899) was a professional baseball player who, in 1882, played one season in the National League. In total he appeared in 54 games, all as a first baseman. He played in 35 games with the Troy Trojans and 19 with Worcester Worcesters. Smith had a .242 batting average in 219 career at bats. His listed height during his playing career was 5'11" and his weight was 210. It is unknown if he batted or threw left or right-handed. He was born in New York City, and died on January 6, 1899 at the age of 40 or 41 in San Francisco, California. He is interred at Holy Cross Cemetery in Colma, California.

References

External links

1858 births
1899 deaths
Troy Trojans players
Worcester Ruby Legs players
Baseball players from New York (state)
Major League Baseball first basemen
19th-century baseball players
San Francisco Knickerbockers players
San Francisco Californias players
San Francisco Haverlys players
San Francisco (minor league baseball) players
Wilmington Blue Hens players
Atlantic City (minor league baseball) players
San Francisco Pioneers players
Burials at Holy Cross Cemetery (Colma, California)